The Robert O. Wilder Building, previously known as the John W. Boddie House and then the Tougaloo Mansion House, is a historic plantation mansion on the campus of Tougaloo College in Tougaloo, Mississippi.

History
The house was completed in 1860 for wealthy cotton planter and slave owner John Williams Boddie who died at the end of the American Civil War. In 1869 the 500-acre former plantation, including the house, was bought for $10,500 by the Freedmen's Bureau and the American Missionary Association to become the campus of a school for Black students who were recently freed from slavery. 

Initially the building was used for a day school and then for housing female students in the upstairs bedrooms. Later it was used as a faculty dorm and for the college president's office. The building was renamed after college trustee Robert O. Wilder to better reflect the school's mission as a historically black college by distancing itself from a slave owner. It was individually listed on the National Register of Historic Places in 1982 and later became a contributing property to the Tougaloo College Historic District in 1998.

The building underwent structural renovations in 2003 and the exterior was refinished in 2012. The interior was renovated in 2020. The rebuilding project funds came from a combination of state and federal grants.

Architecture
A large majority of the Antebellum plantation houses are of a Greek Revival style and the house is an unusual example Italianate architecture. It was designed by local architect and builder Jacob Lamour of Canton. The building is a two-story Italianate plantation house with a gabled roof, bracketed cornices, and a belvedere. There is a grand entrance frontispiece with a six-panel front door.

See also
 Annandale Plantation: another Italianate house also designed by Jacob Lamour

References

National Register of Historic Places in Madison County, Mississippi
Houses in Madison County, Mississippi
Houses on the National Register of Historic Places in Mississippi
Italianate architecture in Mississippi
Individually listed contributing properties to historic districts on the National Register in Mississippi
Houses completed in 1860
University and college buildings on the National Register of Historic Places in Mississippi
Plantation houses in Mississippi
Tougaloo College